St. John in the Wilderness (also known as St. John-in-the-Wilderness) in Flat Rock, North Carolina was the first Episcopal Church in Western North Carolina.

It was consecrated by Bishop Levi Silliman Ives on August 28, 1836. Charles and Susan Baring, who considered Charleston, South Carolina too hot in the summer, were among the first settlers of Flat Rock in the 1820s. Other people moved from Charleston to Flat Rock, which Bishop Ives called a "new but interesting settlement" in 1837. The church started as a private chapel for the Barings, who later transferred the title to Bishop Ives and the Episcopal Diocese of North Carolina. 20 members "formed themselves into a congregation". A building from the 1850s is a contributing structure to Flat Rock Historic District, which is on the National Register of Historic Places.

St. John, named for John the Baptist, was unusual in that white people and slaves sat together in church. The first wedding performed in St. John's was between two slaves. Later, slaves and free blacks were buried in the church's cemetery.

Before 1958, St. John's did not have enough members to stay open year-round, but the number of members has increased to 400. The church building was renovated in 2004.

References

External links 
 

1836 establishments in North Carolina
19th-century Episcopal church buildings
Cemeteries on the National Register of Historic Places in North Carolina
Churches completed in 1836
Churches on the National Register of Historic Places in North Carolina
Episcopal church buildings in North Carolina
Historic American Buildings Survey in North Carolina
Historic district contributing properties in North Carolina
National Register of Historic Places in Henderson County, North Carolina